Back from the Dead is the debut extended play (EP) from Australian indie rock band, Last Dinosaurs, released on 26 February 2010.

Track listing

Charts

References

2010 debut EPs
Last Dinosaurs albums
Dew Process albums